UNSW Residential Communities (UNSWRC) manages the Student Accommodation portfolio at the University of New South Wales (UNSW) in Kensington, Sydney, Australia, under the Division of Student Services.

History

The University of New South Wales student residential community was founded in 1959, with Basser College. UNSW's student accommodation portfolio has since expanded to include college and apartment style residences, both on campus and in neighboring suburban areas.

Redevelopment

UNSW's $110 million redevelopment of its student accommodation facility was completed in January 2014. The first of the new facilities, the University Terraces launched in 2013, added 371 new apartments, cafes, bars and a supermarket to the Gate 2 precinct of Kensington campus. The existing Kensington Colleges have been completely rebuilt, and three new colleges added to the portfolio: Fig Tree Hall, Colombo House and UNSW Hall.

UNSW Colleges 

UNSW Colleges include the Kensington Colleges and three new facilities: Colombo House, Fig Tree Hall and UNSW Hall.

 Basser College
The founding UNSW Residential College named after Sir Adolph Basser, a Polish optician, jeweller and philanthropist. A large donation from Basser saw construction begin 1957, less than a decade after the establishment of New South Wales University of Technology (renamed University of New South Wales in 1958). The college was inaugurated by the Governor-General, Sir William Joseph Slim, on 1 July 1959

 Goldstein College
Named after philanthropist Philip Goldstein, the second UNSW College was opened by then NSW Premier, J. B. Renshaw, on 30 June 1964. The College and separate dining hall were designed by Government Architect, E. H. Farmer and assisted by Peter Hall (successor of Jørn Utzon as supervising architect for the Sydney Opera House). The Dining Hall building won the Sulman Award for architecture in 1965. A bronze sculpture (Untitled) designed by Australian sculptor Bert Flugelman, stands in the Goldstein courtyard.

 Phillip Baxter College
The largest of the three, original Kensington Colleges, Baxter College was named after the University's first Vice-Chancellor, Sir Philip Baxter. The college was opened by then Education and Research Minister (later Prime Minister) John Gorton, on 14 October 1966.

 Colombo House
A brand new residential college that opened in Semester 1, 2014. Named in honor of UNSW's involvement in the Colombo Plan, Colombo House is the only UNSW College that is completely self-catered. All rooms are single occupancy with private en suites. There are shared kitchens on every floor and a large, catering-style kitchen on the ground floor.

 Fig Tree Hall 
A new residential college that opened in Semester 1, 2014. The college is fully catered and all rooms have private en suites. Fig Tree Hall is the only college that offers residents a choice of male and female floors and halal cuisine. The entire facility is also completely alcohol free. UNSW is a considered a respectfully secular organisation and follows government anti-discrimination guidelines. UNSW's 'Don't Assume Campaign', exemplifies the UNSW's ideology of a respectful, inclusive and diverse university environment.

 UNSW Hall
Upon the completion of the redevelopment in January 2014, the existing Philip Baxter College will be re-purposed to become UNSW Hall. The college in 2022 will be a fully-catered facility, offering students three meals per day during session. The temporary facility has shared bathrooms and single rooms.

UNSW Apartments 
UNSW Apartments offer independent, self-catered and shared accommodation. Contracts are taken on a yearly basis and function similarly to a commercial tenancy agreement, except that maintenance and utilities are included. UNSW also manages the placement of students, ensuring a balance of male and female occupants is maintained in each premises.

 Barker St Apartments
 Mulwaree Apartments
 University Terraces
 High Street Apartments

References

External links
 University of New South Wales
 UNSW Colleges
 UNSW Apartments
 Colleges vs Apartments

Residential Communities